Jesse Davis (born September 15, 1991) is an American football guard for the Pittsburgh Steelers of the National Football League (NFL). He played college football at Idaho.

College career
Born and raised in Asotin in the southeast corner of Washington state, Davis was recruited as a defensive tackle by Idaho in nearby Moscow. He started twelve games for the Vandals at defensive tackle in 2012, then was moved to offensive tackle in spring camp in 2013.

Professional career

Seattle Seahawks
Davis signed with the Seattle Seahawks as an undrafted free agent on May 2, 2015, but was waived on August 31.

New York Jets
On January 11, 2016, Davis signed with the New York Jets, but was waived on August 28. He was signed to the Jets' practice squad on November 1, but was released two weeks later.

Miami Dolphins
On November 22, 2016, Davis was signed to the Miami Dolphins' practice squad. then  signed a reserve/future contract with the team on January 10, 2017.

Davis made the Dolphins 53-man roster in 2017, and made his NFL debut at left guard in the team's season opener against the Los Angeles Chargers. He started Week 8 and 9 at left guard, then finished the season as the starting right tackle in place of the injured Ja'Wuan James.

Davis was named the starting right guard to begin the 2018 season.

On September 7, 2019, Davis signed a three-year, $15 million contract extension with the Dolphins.

Davis was placed on the reserve/COVID-19 list by the team on November 23, 2020, and activated on November 26.

Davis was released after five seasons with the Miami Dolphins on March 24, 2022.

Minnesota Vikings
On March 28, 2022, Davis signed with the Minnesota Vikings.

Pittsburgh Steelers
On August 30, 2022, Davis was traded to the Pittsburgh Steelers for a 2025 conditional seventh-round pick.

References

External links
Idaho Vandals bio
Miami Dolphins bio

1991 births
Living people
American football offensive guards
Idaho Vandals football players
Seattle Seahawks players
New York Jets players
Miami Dolphins players
Minnesota Vikings players
People from Asotin County, Washington
Players of American football from Washington (state)
Pittsburgh Steelers players